Spain competed at the 2002 European Athletics Championships in Munich, Germany, from 6–11 August 2002.

Medals

Results

Men
Track & road events

Field events

Combined events – Decathlon

Women
Track & road events

Field events

Combined events – Heptathlon

Nations at the 2002 European Athletics Championships
2002
European Athletics Championships